NTNU may refer to:

National Taiwan Normal University, Taipei, Taiwan
Nigerian Turkish Nile University, Abuja, Nigeria
Norwegian University of Science and Technology (Norges teknisk-naturvitenskapelige universitet), Trondheim, Ålesund and Gjøvik, Norway